The Aaron Martin Houses are a pair of historic houses in Waltham, Massachusetts.  Built between 1892 and 1900, these Colonial Revival houses have similar massing, with hip roofs and double-window hip dormers.  Windows on their main facades are treated with pediments incised with floral decoration, and their porches have turned posts.  They were built by Aaron Martin, a real estate speculator and Waltham Watch Company employee who lived in a more elaborate house on Moody Street.

The houses were listed on the National Register of Historic Places in 1989.

See also
National Register of Historic Places listings in Waltham, Massachusetts

References

Houses in Waltham, Massachusetts
Houses completed in 1892
Houses on the National Register of Historic Places in Waltham, Massachusetts
Colonial Revival architecture in Massachusetts